Blackwood-Stirling was an electoral district of the Legislative Assembly in the Australian state of Western Australia. It took parts of the South West and Great Southern regions of Western Australia.

Politically, Blackwood-Stirling was a conservative seat. It was theoretically competitive between the two conservative forces in Western Australian politics, namely the Liberal Party and the National Party.

History
Blackwood-Stirling was first created for the 2008 state election. It was essentially an amalgamation of the Liberal-held district of Warren-Blackwood and the National-held district of Stirling, although parts of each ended up in neighbouring districts. Of the new district's voters, 52% came from the former district, while 37% came from the latter. The remaining 11% was previously a part of the National-held district of Wagin. The former member for Stirling, National MP Terry Redman, won the seat at the election.

Prior to the 2013 state election, an electoral redistribution shifted the district to the west, moving many of the former Stirling voters into the district of Wagin and adding voters from the district of Collie-Preston.  The realigned district was now essentially an expanded version of the old Warren-Blackwood district and the former name was resumed.

Geography
Blackwood-Stirling incorporated the following government councils: Shire of Boyup Brook, Shire of Bridgetown-Greenbushes, Shire of Cranbrook, Shire of Denmark, Shire of Manjimup, Shire of Nannup, Shire of Plantagenet, and a southern portion of the Shire of Augusta-Margaret River.

Members for Blackwood-Stirling

Election results

References

External links
 
 

Former electoral districts of Western Australia
2008 establishments in Australia
2013 disestablishments in Australia
Constituencies established in 2008
Constituencies disestablished in 2013